The Pink Panther is a series of films featuring the fictional Inspector Clouseau, played by Peter Sellers, that began in 1963.

The Pink Panther may also refer to:

People
 Paula Creamer (born 1986), an American professional golfer nicknamed "The Pink Panther"
 Zoe Jones, an English women's professional darts player nicknamed "The Pink Panther"
 Jim Rock, an Irish professional boxer nicknamed "The Pink Panther"

Arts, media, and entertainment

Fictional elements
 Pink Panther (character), main and title character in a series of animated short films, originally appearing in the 1963 film
 Pink Panther jewel, the titular pink diamond of the film series

Films
The Pink Panther (1963 film), starring David Niven, and Peter Sellers as Inspector Clouseau
A Shot in the Dark (1964 film), starring Sellers and Herbert Lom as Commissioner Dreyfus
Inspector Clouseau, 1968 film starring Alan Arkin as Inspector Clouseau
The Return of the Pink Panther, 1975 film starring Sellers and Lom
The Pink Panther Strikes Again, 1976 film starring Sellers and Lom
Revenge of the Pink Panther, 1978 film starring Sellers and Lom
Trail of the Pink Panther, 1982 film starring Sellers and Lom
Curse of the Pink Panther, 1983 film starring Lom and Ted Wass as Clifton Sleigh
Son of the Pink Panther, 1993 film starring Lom and Roberto Benigni as Jacques Gambrelli
The Pink Panther (2006 film), series reboot, starring Steve Martin as Clouseau and Kevin Kline as Dreyfus
 The Pink Panther 2, 2009 film, the sequel to the 2006 film, starring Martin and John Cleese as Dreyfus

Music
 "The Pink Panther Theme", theme for the Pink Panther films and animated shorts, written by Henry Mancini
 The Pink Panther: Music from the Film Score Composed and Conducted by Henry Mancini, soundtrack album of the 1964 Pink Panther film
 The Pink Panther (2006 soundtrack), soundtrack album of the 2006 Pink Panther film

Television
 The Pink Panther (1993 TV series), animated television series
 The Pink Panther Show (1969 TV series), a television series of Pink Panther cartoons
 Pink Panther and Sons (1984 TV series), a cartoon television series
 Pink Panther and Pals (2010 TV series), a television cartoon series

Sculptures
 Pink Panther (sculpture), a sculpture from the Jeff Koons series Banality

Organizations
 The Pink Panthers, a name used by different gay rights organizations in North America and worldwide since the 1970s
 Pink Panthers, a name given to an international jewel thief network by Interpol

Sports
 Jaipur Pink Panthers, an Indian Kabaddi team in the Pro Kabaddi League.

Confectionery
 There is a kind of pink wafer with Pink Panther branding

See also

 Passport to Peril, a point-and-click video game featuring the pink panther cartoon character
 Land Rover, painted with pink camouflage for desert operations
 Pink (disambiguation)
 Panther (disambiguation)